Sundai, Edo is a woodblock print by the Japanese ukiyo-e artist Hokusai. It was produced as the fifth print in the series Thirty-six Views of Mount Fuji from c. 1830 to 1832 in the late Edo period.

Precursors

Image

Description 
This print is a yoko-e, that is, a landscape format produced to the ōban size, about 25 cm high by 37 cm wide.

It is a polychrome woodblock print, composed of ink and color on paper.

The composition is made up of travelers and workers on a road, with a large pine tree on the left side, the corner of a house on the right, and Mount Fuji in the distance.

Technique

References 

1830s paintings
Works by Hokusai
Woodblock printing
Japanese paintings
Japan